Deepak Shukla (born in India) is an American molecular virologist with expertise in herpesviruses. He contributed to the discovery of HSV-1 entry receptors and establishing a link between the receptors and HSV-1 induced ocular diseases such as keratitis and retinitis. He has authored over 100 published papers and several book chapters on herpes viruses.

Early life and education
Shukla was born in Sir Sunderlal Hospital of Banaras Hindu University, Varanasi.  He studied at Kendriya Vidyalaya BHU and obtained his bachelor's degree in chemistry from BHU. He also obtained a master's degree in biochemistry before joining the University of Illinois at Chicago (UIC) for a PhD degree in microbiology and immunology. In 1996 he was awarded his PhD. He received his postdoctoral training with Patricia Spear at Northwestern University in Chicago.

Family
He is the youngest son of Kala Rani Shukla and Ram Chandra Shukla. He has six siblings: Rekha, Pradeep, Dileep, Prakash, Rachana, and Anand, who all live in India. Deepak Shukla became a naturalized citizen of the US in 2007.

Work and awards
In 2001 Shukla joined UIC as an assistant professor of virology. He is jointly employed by the UIC Department of Ophthalmology and Visual Science and the Department of Microbiology and Immunology. Currently, he serves as the Marion H. Schenk Esq. Professor in Ophthalmology. He is also a professor of virology and the director of the Ocular Virology Laboratory of UIC.

Shukla has been directly associated with the discoveries of HSV-1 entry receptors, 3-O. Besides 3-O sulfated heparan sulfate, he also cloned and characterized the receptors (HVEM, nectin-1 and 3-O sulfated heparan sulfate) for experimental HSV-1 infection in mice. His more recent works include identification of a phagocytosis-like pathway for HSV-1 entry into ocular cells, significance of heparan sulfate in ocular infection, significance of autophagy in herpes infection, and development of a nanoparticle based herpes vaccine. He also discovered viral surfing in herpesviruses. His laboratory was first to implicate heparanase in HSV-1 release and syndecans in HSV-1 entry and cell-to-cell fusion. He has also used his knowledge of HSV-1 entry mechanism to identify new pharmaceutical agents to protect and treat HSV-1 infection in laboratory animals. His work has also focused on genital herpes and ways to control the spread of the disease.

His work has been recognized with merit awards and research grants from various organizations, including from the American Herpes Foundation (2001) for herpesvirus research and his discovery of a receptor for HSV-1 entry; the National Institute of Allergy and Infectious Diseases (2002–present); the Illinois Society to Prevent Blindness (2004); The Glaucoma Foundation (2007 and 2010); and the National Eye Institute (2013–present). Shukla received the Lew Wasserman Merit Award from Research to Prevent Blindness in 2009.

Selected works
 "A novel role for 3-O-sulfated heparan Sulfate in herpes simplex virus 1 entry" (1999)
 "A novel role for phagocytosis-like uptake in herpes simplex virus entry" (2006)
 "Viral entry mechanisms: simplicity drives complexity" (2009)
 "Herpesviruses and heparan sulfate: an intimate relationship in aid of viral entry" (2001)
"Striking similarity of murine nectin-1alpha to human nectin-1alpha (HveC) in sequence and activity as a glycoprotein D receptor for alphaherpesvirus entry." (2000)
"A novel role for phagocytosis-like uptake in herpes simplex virus entry" (2000)
"Anti-heparan sulfate peptides that block herpes simplex virus infection in vivo." (2011)
"A novel function of heparan sulfate in the regulation of cell-cell fusion." (2009)
"Heparanase is a host enzyme required for herpes simplex virus-1 release from cells." (2015)
"Prophylactic, therapeutic and neutralizing effects of zinc oxide tetrapod structures against herpes simplex virus type-2 infection." (2012) 
"Extended Release of an Anti-Heparan Sulfate Peptide From a Contact Lens Suppresses Corneal Herpes Simplex Virus-1 Infection." (2016)
"Autophagy stimulation abrogates herpes simplex virus-1 infection." (2015)
"Cultured corneas show dendritic spread and restrict herpes simplex virus infection that is not observed with cultured corneal cells." (2017)
"Intravaginal Zinc Oxide Tetrapod Nanoparticles as Novel Immunoprotective Agents against Genital Herpes." (2016)

References

 College of Medicine at Chicago: Deepak Shukla
 Department of Microbiology & Immunology: Deepak Shukla
 "Nanoparticles hold promise as double-edged sword against genital herpes"(2016)
"Researchgate Profile"
"Top five most productive lab since 2010"

Living people
American virologists
Kendriya Vidyalaya alumni
Banaras Hindu University alumni
Year of birth missing (living people)
Fellows of the American Academy of Microbiology